London County Cricket Club was a short-lived cricket club founded by the Crystal Palace Company. In 1898 they invited WG Grace to help them form a first-class cricket club. Grace accepted the offer and became the club's secretary, manager and captain. As a result, he severed his connection with Gloucestershire CCC during the 1899 season. The club played first-class matches between 1900 and 1904.

The club's home ground was Crystal Palace Park Cricket Ground in south London. Some of the leading players of the time played matches for the club while continuing to play for their usual teams, among them CB Fry, JWHT Douglas, Albert Trott and Ranjitsinhji. The increase in the  importance of the County Championship, Grace's own inevitable decline in form (given that he was over fifty years old) and the lack of a competitive element in the matches led to a decline in attendances and consequently meant the team lost money. The final first-class matches were played in 1904 and the enterprise folded in 1908.

In 2004 the club was relaunched by former Essex, Somerset and Leicestershire wicketkeeper-batsman Neil Burns as a mentoring organisation for the development and support of cricketers.

See also 
 List of London County Cricket Club players

Notes

References 
 WG Grace gets the hump, Cricinfo, 28 January 2006
 Cricket Archive Scorecard Oracle
 London County Cricket Club (home page of the modern club)

Further reading
Brian Pearce, Cricket at the Crystal Palace: W.G. Grace and the London County Cricket Club, Crystal Palace Foundation, 2004,

External links
 First-class matches played by London County at CricketArchive
 Other matches played by London County at CricketArchive 

 
Cricket clubs established in 1898
Former senior cricket clubs
Cricket teams in London
1898 establishments in England
1908 disestablishments in England